Oreilles de crisse is a traditional Quebec dish consisting of deep-fried salted fatback. It is generally served in cabanes à sucre (sugar shacks) in spring time, as a salty and crunchy side contrasting with maple syrup-laden foods.

See also 
 Chicharrón
 Pork rinds
 List of deep fried foods
 List of smoked foods

External links 
 Recipe 

Cuisine of Quebec
Pork dishes
Deep fried foods
Smoked meat
Canadian cuisine